Ric Browde is an American author, record producer, and songwriter. In the 1970s, Browde was working as a roadie, writing music for films, and involved in the production of albums by guitarist Ted Nugent, first as his assistant and later on as producer. Browde worked on seven Nugent albums, including platinum awarded Double Live Gonzo, Scream Dream, and Intensities in 10 Cities, before starting his own production company in 1982 and producing W.A.S.P., and Victory.

Browde was involved in the emergence of the Los Angeles glam music scene in the 1980s. He produced and arranged Poison's multi-platinum debut album, Look What the Cat Dragged In, which unexpectedly captivated American audiences in 1987. Browde followed by producing, arranging and co-writing Faster Pussycat's debut album in 1987, and co-writing and co-producing Joan Jett's return to commercial success with Up Your Alley in 1988. Browde later produced a series of commercially unsuccessful albums, including The Dogs D'Amour's Straight??!!, Finnish guitarist Andy McCoy, LA Glamsters, Jetboy, English girl group No Shame, Los Angeles bands Flies on Fire and Kill For Thrills, and the Italian band Armed Venus.

Browde has recorded thirty-six albums to date and sold over twenty-seven million records earning eight platinum and eleven gold records.

After his record sales dwindled, Browde made a career change with his satirical and somewhat autobiographical novel, While I'm Dead...Feed the Dog in 1999. Translated into several languages, the book was also adapted into the 2012 film Behaving Badly. The film did not see release until 2014 and has been publicly disavowed by Browde who has lampooned the movie in his blog, "While I'm Dead...Feed the Dog...the Blog - the story behind the story behind the movie that has nothing to do with the story."  He also took a job as a telephone psychic to write a book about the scam phone psychic business that defrauded millions of unwitting people across the United States of hundreds of million dollars.  The book "Tale From the Psychic Hot Line" is still available on kindle 

Browde then became interested in animal rescue and started out as a shelter volunteer in Los Angeles and Los Angeles County shelters before joining and eventually becoming President of Wings of Rescue, a charity that flies at-risk pets from disaster areas and overcrowded shelters to safe havens and delivers humanitarian and veterinary aid to disaster victims.

References

1954 births
Place of birth missing (living people)
Living people
Record producers from California
Songwriters from California
Novelists from California